The 1922–23 FA Cup was the 48th season of the world's oldest association football competition, the Football Association Challenge Cup (more usually known as the FA Cup). Bolton Wanderers won the competition, beating West Ham United 2–0 in the first final to be held at Wembley Stadium, London.

Matches were scheduled to be played at the stadium of the team named first on the date specified for each round, which was always a Saturday. If scores were level after 90 minutes had been played, a replay would take place at the stadium of the second-named team later the same week. If the replayed match was drawn further replays would be held at neutral venues until a winner was determined. If scores were level after 90 minutes had been played in a replay, a 30-minute period of extra time would be played.

Calendar
The format of the FA Cup for the season had two preliminary rounds, six qualifying rounds, four proper rounds, and the semi finals and final.

First round proper
41 of the 44 clubs from the Football League First Division and Football League Second Division joined the 12 lower-league clubs who came through the qualifying rounds. Three Second Division sides, Port Vale, Stockport County and Coventry City, were entered at the fifth qualifying round, with nine of the Third Division North sides (Accrington Stanley, Ashington, Darlington, Grimsby Town, Hartlepools United, Southport, Stalybridge Celtic, Walsall and Wrexham) and Third Division South teams except Exeter City and Southend United, who were entered in the fourth qualifying round along with the rest of Division 3 North. All three sides lost in their first game. Amateur side Corinthian were given a free entry to the first round. To make the number of teams up to 64, nine Third Division South sides and only one Third Division North side were given byes to this round. These were:

Watford
Brighton & Hove Albion
Luton Town
Swindon Town
Queens Park Rangers
Millwall
Plymouth Argyle
Bristol City
Portsmouth
Bradford Park Avenue

32 matches were scheduled to be played on Saturday, 13 January 1923. Twelve matches were drawn and went to replays in the following midweek fixture, of which three went to another replay, and one match went to a third.

Second round proper
The 16 Second Round matches were played on Saturday, 3 February 1923. Five matches were drawn, with replays taking place in the following midweek fixture.

Third round proper
The eight Third Round matches were scheduled for Saturday, 24 February 1923. Two matches were drawn and went to replays in the following midweek fixture.

Fourth round proper
The four Fourth Round matches were scheduled for Saturday, 10 March 1923. There was one replay, between Southampton and West Ham United, played in the following midweek fixture. However, this went to a second replay, which West Ham won.

Semi-finals

The semi-final matches were played on Saturday, 24 March 1923. The matches ended in victories for Bolton Wanderers and West Ham United, who went on to meet in the final at Wembley.

Final

The final was held on 28 April 1923 at the original Wembley Stadium in London.  It was the first football match to be played at the newly built stadium. King George V was in attendance to present the trophy to the winning team. Bolton Wanderers won the match 2–0, through goals from David Jack and Jack Smith

Match details

See also
FA Cup Final Results 1872-

References
General
Official site; fixtures and results service at TheFA.com
1922-23 FA Cup at rsssf.com
1922-23 FA Cup at soccerbase.com

Specific

 
FA Cup seasons
FA
Cup